Alonzo Church (June 14, 1903 – August 11, 1995) was an American mathematician, computer scientist, logician, and philosopher who made major contributions to mathematical logic and the foundations of theoretical computer science. He is best known for the lambda calculus, the Church–Turing thesis, proving the unsolvability of the Entscheidungsproblem, the Frege–Church ontology, and the Church–Rosser theorem. He also worked on philosophy of language (see e.g. Church 1970). Alongside his doctoral student Alan Turing, Church is considered one of the founders of computer science.

Life
Alonzo Church was born on June 14, 1903, in Washington, D.C., where his father, Samuel Robbins Church, was a Justice of the Peace and the judge of the Municipal Court for the District of Columbia. He was the grandson of Alonzo Webster Church (1829-1909), United States Senate Librarian from 1881-1901, and great grandson of Alonzo Church, a Professor of Mathematics and Astronomy and 6th President of the University of Georgia. As a young boy, Church was partially blinded by an air gun accident. The family later moved to Virginia after his father lost his position at the university because of failing eyesight. With help from his uncle, also named Alonzo Church, the son attended the private Ridgefield School for Boys in Ridgefield, Connecticut. After graduating from Ridgefield in 1920, Church attended Princeton University, where he was an exceptional student. He published his first paper on Lorentz transformations in 1924 and graduated the same year with a degree in mathematics. He stayed at Princeton for graduate work, earning a Ph.D. in mathematics in three years under Oswald Veblen.

He married Mary Julia Kuczinski in 1925. The couple had three children, Alonzo Jr. (1929), Mary Ann (1933) and Mildred (1938).

After receiving his Ph.D., he taught briefly as an instructor at the University of Chicago. He received a two-year National Research Fellowship that enabled him to attend Harvard University in 1927–1928, and the University of Göttingen and University of Amsterdam the following year.

He taught philosophy and mathematics at Princeton for nearly four decades, from 1929–1967. He held the Flint Professorship of Philosophy and Mathematics at the University of California, Los Angeles, 1967–1990. He was a Plenary Speaker at the ICM in 1962 in Stockholm.

He received honorary Doctor of Science degrees from Case Western Reserve University in 1969, Princeton University in 1985, and the University at Buffalo, The State University of New York in 1990 in connection with an international symposium in his honor organized by John Corcoran.

He was elected a Corresponding Fellow of the British Academy (FBA) in 1966, to the American Academy of the Arts and Sciences in 1967, to the National Academy of Sciences in 1978.

A deeply religious person, Church was a lifelong member of the Presbyterian church. He died on August 11, 1995 at the age of 92. He is buried in Princeton Cemetery.

Mathematical work
Church is known for the following significant accomplishments:
His proof that the Entscheidungsproblem, which asks for a decision procedure to determine the truth of arbitrary propositions in a first-order mathematical theory, is undecidable. This is known as Church's theorem. 
His invention of the lambda calculus.
His utilization of the lambda calculus to prove that Peano arithmetic is undecidable.
His articulation of what has come to be known as the Church–Turing thesis.
Being a founding editor of the Journal of Symbolic Logic, editing its reviews section for 43 years from 1936 until 1979.
His authorship of a prominent textbook in the field of mathematical logic for many generations, Introduction to Mathematical Logic
The Church–Rosser theorem

The lambda calculus emerged in his 1936 paper showing the unsolvability of the Entscheidungsproblem.  This result preceded Alan Turing's work on the halting problem, which also demonstrated the existence of a problem unsolvable by mechanical means. Upon hearing of Church's work, Turing enrolled at Princeton later that year under Church for a Ph.D.  Church and Turing then showed that the lambda calculus and the Turing machine used in Turing's halting problem were equivalent in capabilities, and subsequently demonstrated a variety of alternative "mechanical processes for computation". This resulted in the Church–Turing thesis.

The efforts for automatically generating a controller implementation from specifications originates from his ideas.

The lambda calculus influenced the design of Lisp and functional programming languages in general. The Church encoding is named in his honor.

In his honor the Alonzo Church Award for Outstanding Contributions to Logic and Computation was established in 2015 by the Association for Computing Machinery Special Interest Group for Logic and Computation (ACM SIGLOG), the European Association for Theoretical Computer Science (EATCS), the European Association for Computer Science Logic (EACSL), and the Kurt Gödel Society (KGS). The award
is for an outstanding contribution to the field published within the past 25 years and must not yet have received recognition via another major award, such as the Turing Award, the Paris Kanellakis Award, or the Gödel Prize.

Philosophical work

 Church is also known for the Frege–Church ontology, which he created based on the philosophical ideas of Gottlob Frege.

Influence 
Over the course of his academic career, Church oversaw 31 doctoral students. Many of them have led distinguished careers in mathematics, computer science, and other academic subjects, including C. Anthony Anderson, Peter B. Andrews, George A. Barnard, David Berlinski, William W. Boone, Martin Davis, Alfred L. Foster, Leon Henkin, John G. Kemeny, Stephen C. Kleene, Simon B. Kochen, Maurice L'Abbé, Isaac Malitz, Gary R. Mar, Michael O. Rabin,  Nicholas Rescher, Hartley Rogers, Jr., J. Barkley Rosser, Dana Scott, Raymond Smullyan, and Alan Turing.

In addition to those he directly supervised, Church also had a large influence on other mathematicians and computer scientists. Haskell Curry, who expanded on Church's ideas with the concept of currying, stated that one of his textbooks, Introduction to Mathematical Logic (1944), was "written with the meticulous precision which characterizes the author's work generally".

Bibliography

Books
 Alonzo Church, Introduction to Mathematical Logic (1944)
 Alonzo Church, The Calculi of Lambda-Conversion (1941)
 Alonzo Church, A Bibliography of Symbolic Logic, 1666–1935
 C. Anthony Anderson and Michael Zelëny, (eds.), Logic, Meaning and Computation: Essays in Memory of Alonzo Church
 Tyler Burge and Herbert Enderton (eds.), The Collected Works of Alonzo Church (2019) (ISBN 978-0-262-02564-5)

See also

 Church–Turing–Deutsch principle
 Higher-order logic
 List of pioneers in computer science
 Platonism#Modern Platonism
 Universal set

Notes

References
 Enderton, Herbert B., Alonzo Church: Life and Work. Introduction to the Collected Works of Alonzo Church, MIT Press, not yet published.
 Enderton, Herbert B., In memoriam: Alonzo Church, The Bulletin of Symbolic Logic, vol. 1, no. 4 (Dec. 1995), pp. 486–488.
 Wade, Nicholas, Alonzo Church, 92, Theorist of the Limits of Mathematics (obituary), The New York Times, September 5, 1995, p. B6.
 Hodges, Wilfred, Obituary: Alonzo Church, The Independent (London), September 14, 1995.
 Alonzo Church interviewed by William Aspray on 17 May 1984. The Princeton Mathematics Community in the 1930s: An Oral-History Project, transcript number 5.
 Rota, Gian-Carlo, Fine Hall in its golden age: Remembrances of Princeton in the early fifties. In A Century of Mathematics in America, Part II, edited by Peter Duren, AMS History of Mathematics, vol 2, American Mathematical Society, 1989, pp. 223–226. Also available  here.

External links
 
 Princeton University Library, Manuscripts Division, The Alonzo Church Papers, 1924–1995: finding aid.
 A bibliography of Church's reviews for The Journal of Symbolic Logic, with a link to each
 
Alonzo Church, 92, Theorist Of the Limits of Mathematics New York Times obituary
OBITUARY: Alonzo Church from The Independent
In memoriam: Alonzo Church (1903–1995) by Irving H. Anellis, Modern Logic Vol. 5, No. 4 (1995). 
In memoriam: Alonzo Church 1903–1995 by H. B. Enderton, The Bulletin of Symbolic Logic Vol. 1, No.5 (1995).

1903 births
1995 deaths
20th-century American mathematicians
American logicians
American Presbyterians
Computability theorists
Princeton University alumni
Harvard University alumni
Princeton University faculty
University of California, Los Angeles faculty
Burials at Princeton Cemetery
Philosophers from Washington, D.C.
Philosophers from California
Philosophers from New Jersey
Mathematicians from Washington, D.C.
20th-century American philosophers
Corresponding Fellows of the British Academy